Elizabeth Fritsch CBE (born 1940) is a British studio potter and ceramic artist born into a Welsh family in Whitchurch on the Shropshire border. Her innovative hand built and painted pots are often influenced by ideas from music, painting, literature, landscape and architecture.

Biography

Elizabeth Fritsch is a studio potter and ceramic artist. She uses fine technically proficient hand built coiling techniques; architectural ceramic form, optical effects and surface design which, are usually hand painted with coloured slips. The stoneware are biscuit fired and often re-fired a number of times. Each Fritsch pot is unique, individual and distinctive. They are usually displayed in selected groups and themes set to the artist's requirements.

Fritsch initially studied at the Birmingham School of Music studying harp, and then piano at the Royal Academy of Music from 1958 to 1964; but she later took up ceramics under Hans Coper and Eduardo Paolozzi at the Royal College of Art from 1968 to 1971. Adopting her career name from her marriage to Jean Mathis-Fritsch (m.1966-71) she had a son Bertie born in 1966. In the seventies Fritsch, was one of the first of a group of progressive 'New Ceramics' to emerge from the Royal College of Art, along with other ceramicists including Alison Britton, Carol McNicoll and Jacqueline Poncelet. Under David Queensbury, the group formed a shift and influence in British ceramic art, breaking away from the more traditional forms, colour, design and function of the more utilitarian ceramics that had preceded. Fritsch lived and worked at Digswell Arts Trust from 1975 to 1983. Her daughter Ruby Hughes was born in 1980 and in the same year was awarded the John Ruskin Bursary for a fictional archaeology project. This project went into developing an important new body of work and shift in the artist career.'Pots from Nowhere'(fictional archaeology) was shown at the Royal College of Art by Queensberry Hunt in 1984.

In 1985, Fritsch set up a studio in London. Since her first show in 1972, Fritsch has had a number of solo shows. In 1996 and 2001 she was shortlisted for the Jerwood Prize for Ceramics. Fritsch's work is represented in major art collections and museums in more than nine countries and her work is represented in major British art museum collections. A major retrospective was held at the National Museum Cardiff, in 2010, featuring a complete range of her most significant studio pottery and recent pieces. Since the late 1970s Fritsch has considered "the space between the second and third dimensions", in her work; a concept she first described as "two-and-a-half dimensions" with her distinctive rhythmic patterns and optical effects. Dynamic Structures: Painted Vessels also marked her 70th birthday.

Awards
2001: Shortlisted for Jerwood Prize for Applied Arts 2001: Ceramics
1996: Shortlisted for Jerwood Prize for Applied Arts 1996: Ceramics 
1995: Awarded CBE:Commander of the British Empire
1995: Elected Senior Fellowship, Royal College of Art
1993: Gold Medali, Visuelle Spiele, International Handwerksmesse München, Germany 
1987: Bernard Leach Centenary Post Office Stamp issue with Hans Coper & Lucie Rie
1980: John Ruskin Bursary for Fictional Archaeology project 
1976: Gold Medal, International Ceramics Competition, Sopot, Poland 
1972: Prize Winner, Royal Copenhagen Jubilee 
1970: Silver Medal Royal College of Art: Herbert Read Memorial Prize

Museum and public collections
Aberystwyth Arts Centre, Aberystwyth, Wales 
Aberdeen Art Gallery & Museum, Aberdeen 
Birmingham Museum and Art Gallery, Birmingham 
Bolton Museum and Art Gallery, Bolton 
Bristol City Museum and Art Gallery, Bristol
British Council, Great Britain 
Crafts Council, London 
Laing Art Gallery, Newcastle, Tyne & Wear 
Lotherton Hall, Leeds, Yorkshire 
Manchester Art Gallery, Manchester
Middlesbrough Institute of Modern Art, Middlesbrough 
National Museums Liverpool, Merseyside 
National Museum of Scotland, Edinburgh
National Museum of Wales,
Norwich Castle Museum & Art Gallery, Norwich 
The Fitzwilliam Museum, Cambridge 
Victoria and Albert Museum, London
York Art Gallery, York
Kunstindustrimuseet, Copenhagen, Denmark 
Musée des Arts Décoratifs, Paris, France 
Museum für Kunst und Gewerbe Hamburg, Germany
Museum of Design, Zürich Museum Bellerive, Zurich, Switzerland 
Metropolitan Museum of Art, New York
National Gallery of Australia, Canberra, Australia 
National Gallery of Victoria, Melbourne, Australia 
Art Gallery of South Australia, Adelaide, Australia 
National Museum of Modern Art, Tokyo, Japan

Solo exhibitions
2010: National Museum Cardiff, Wales, UK. Dynamic Structures: Painted Vessels, October 2010– January 2011
2008: Fine Art Society - London November -December.
2007: Retrospective, Bonhams, London
2007: Anthony Hepworth Gallery, Bath
2000: Metaphysical Vessels, Mobilia Gallery, Cambridge, Massachusetts
2000: Memory of Architecture, Part II, Besson Gallery, London
1998: Sea Pieces, Contemporary Applied Arts, London
1995–6: Retrospective touring to Munich, Karlsruhe, Halle and Bellerive, Zurich
1995: Metaphysical Pots, Bellerive Museum
1994–5: Order and Chaos, Bellas Artes, Santa Fe, New Mexico
1994: Osiris Gallery, Brussels
1993–5: Vessels from Another World, Northern Centre for the Contemporary Arts, Sunderland, travelling to Aberdeen, Birmingham, Cardiff, London, Norwich, UK 
1992–3: Retrospective, Pilscheur Fine Art, London
1991: Hetjens Museum, Düsseldorf, Germany
1990: Cross Rhythms and Counterpoint, Edinburgh, Scotland
1978: Leeds Galleries, Temple Newsham; travelled to Glasgow, Bristol, Gateshead, Bolton, and V&A, London
1976: British Craft Centre, London
1974: Waterloo Place Gallery, London
1972: Bing and Grondahl, Copenhagen

Bibliography
Edward Lucie-Smith on Elizabeth Fritsch: Vessels from another World, Metaphysical pots Painted Stoneware, Bellew Publishing, 1993.  
Peter Dormer and David Cripps “Elizabeth Fritsch in Studio – A view”, In Studio Series, Bellew, London, 1985. 
Elizabeth Fritsch, pots about music. Authors: Elizabeth Fritsch, David Cripps, Leeds City Art Gallery (England), David Queensberry, Alison Britton, Ian Bennett. Publisher, Leeds Art Galleries, 1978, ASIN B0007AT9X2
E. Cameron & P. Lewis, Potters on Pottery, Elizabeth Fritsch, pgs. 62-69 Evans Brothers, London 1976.

Articles
The Wall Street Journal "A New Spin on Ceramics" by Margaret Studer, 18 May 2006
Moira Vincentelli Women & Ceramics, Gendered Vessels, Manchester University Press, 2000, p. 249. , 
Garth Clark The Potter's Art, Phaidon 1995, pp. 200–201. , 
John Houston The Abstract Pot forms of expression and decoration by nine artist potters, Bellew Publishing, 1991.
Fischer Fine Art (1986) Nine Potters: Bernard Leach, Katherine Pleydell-Bouverie, Michael Cardew, Hans Coper, Lucie Rie, Elizabeth Fritsch, Ewen Henderson, Elizabeth Raeburn, Claudi Casanovas, Catalogue of an exhibition held at Fisher Fine Art, 1986.  ASIN B001ON0RX2
John Russell Taylor, "Elizabeth Fritsch: Pots About Music" Ceramic Review, 58 Jul/Aug 1979 pgs 30–33.
J.D.H. Catleugh "Recent Pots: Improvisations from Earth to Air", Ceramic Review, 44 Mar/Apr 1977 pg 7.

Broadcasts and podcasts
British library, Sounds Oral History, On 6 July 2004, (1 of 14) National Life Stories Collection: Crafts' Lives

BBC Private Passions, Classic Arts Production, On 14 April 2001 Michael Berkeley's guest was Elizabeth Fritsch

Victoria and Albert Museum, London, Ceramic Points of View: 'Optical Pot', by Elizabeth Fritsch Video Podcasts

References

1940 births
Living people
People from Whitchurch, Shropshire
20th-century British women artists
21st-century British women artists
Alumni of Birmingham Conservatoire
Alumni of the Royal Academy of Music
Alumni of the Royal College of Art
British potters
Commanders of the Order of the British Empire
Women potters
British women ceramicists